Podochilus australiensis, commonly known as the native stream orchid, is a species of epiphytic or lithophytic orchid. It has a fern-like appearance with many thin, twisted, glossy green leaves and clusters of up to six dull white or greenish flowers with a green labellum. It grows tropical North Queensland.

Description
Flowering occurs from March to June.

Taxonomy and naming
The native stream orchid was first formally described in 1886 by Frederick Manson Bailey who gave it the name Eria australiensis and published the description in Occasional Papers on the Queensland Flora. In 1907 Rudolf Schlechter changed the name to Podochilus australiensis. The specific epithet (australiensis) refers to Australia, the ending -ensis being a Latin suffix "denoting place", "locality" or "country".

Distribution and habitat
Podochilus australiensis grows in humid forests, often on branches over streams or on rotting logs and boulders. It is found between the McIlwraith Range and the Tully River in Queensland.

Use in horticulture
Easy to grow, but needs water all year round, high humidity, and warmth (not below 10 °C). Can be grown on a slab or in a small pot with a coarse mix.

References

External links

A good description with an excellent photo of the flower at The Internet Orchid Species Photo Encyclopedia.

Eriinae
Orchids of New Guinea
Orchids of Queensland
Orchids of Australia
Plants described in 1886